Colin Bell (1 March 1942 – 24 April 2003) was an English sociologist who served as the Vice-Chancellor for the University of Bradford between 1998 and 2001 and who was later Principal at the University of Stirling. He died suddenly  on 24 April 2003 and the University of Bradford now holds an annual memorial lecture in his name discussing widening participation. The University of Stirling named the building currently housing the Department of Social Science after him.

Life
Bell was born in Kent, graduated from the University of Keele and was awarded his postgraduate degree at the University of Wales. He was well known for his internationalism, his opposition to the Iraq War, which began shortly before his death, and his dedication to the cause of making higher education more accessible to students from socially deprived backgrounds.

He married twice: to Jocelyn Mumford in 1964 and later to Janette Webb. He had four children—Rachel and Luke by his first marriage, and two daughters Islay (b. 1989) and Catherine (b. 1992) by his second.

References

External links 
Article on the life and death of Prof. Colin Bell by the BBC
Obituary in the Independent 
Colin Bell at "Pioneers of Qualitative Research" from the Economic and Social Data Service

 
 
 

English sociologists
People associated with the University of Stirling
People associated with the University of Bradford
1942 births
2003 deaths
Alumni of Keele University
Alumni of the University of Wales
Vice-Chancellors of the University of Bradford